Zulaikha Abd ar-Rahman Abu Risha (born 1942) is a Jordanian poet and activist. She has been a vocal advocate of women's rights, particularly concerning making the Arabic language more gender-inclusive.

Early life and education 
Zlaikha Abu Risha was born in 1942 in Acre, a city in what is now Israel. She describes herself as having Palestinian, Jordanian, and Syrian roots.

She studied Arabic literature at the University of Jordan, graduating with a bachelor's degree in 1966 and a master's in 1989. She later pursued a doctorate at the University of Exeter, where she wrote her thesis on "Women in Arabic Feminist Literature"

Career 
Abu Risha is perhaps best known for her work as a poet and fiction writer. She has been considered a prominent member of the Jordanian literary scene.

In 1987, Abu Risha published the short story collection In the Cell, for which she won a prize from the University of Jordan. She has also written at least 10 books of poetry beginning in 1998, as well as a book of autobiographical essays, Ghajarul ma'a, in 1999. And she has produced several works of children's literature, as well as a 2002 academic study of the genre, Towards a Theory of Children’s Literature (2002).

Through hosting events in which refugees told folktales, she produced the book Timeless Tales: Folktales Told by Syrian Refugees, containing 21 folk stories.

Abu Risha also writes nonfiction on feminist criticism, literature, art, and gender and language. She has been a columnist for newspapers and magazines in Jordan and across the Arab world. She has also served as editor of the magazines al-Mu'allim/at-talib (published by UNESCO/UNRWA) and Al-Funun (an art journal published by the Jordanian Ministry of Culture), and as director of al-Warraqat li-d-dirasat wal-buhuth, a feminist publishing house. In 2019, she served as a judge for the International Prize for Arabic Fiction.

She has also worked as a university lecturer and served as director of the Center for Women's Studies in Amman, Jordan.

Abu Risha is also known for her work as a human rights and women's rights activist. She has fought to make the Arabic language more inclusive of women, writing two books on the subject: The Absent Language: Towards a Gender-Neutral Language (1996) and The Language Female: Papers on Discourse and Gender (2009). Her women's rights advocacy since the early 1980s has made her a target of extremist groups, which have sought to incite violence against her. She has also been the target of lawsuits from Amman's Public Prosecution Office for comments on Islam.

References 

Living people
1942 births
People from Acre, Israel
Jordanian women writers
Jordanian women activists
Jordanian human rights activists
University of Jordan alumni
Jordanian academics